Northwest Columbus is a region in Franklin County, Ohio.  It has about 45,000 residents, according to the 2010 U.S. census.

Northwest Columbus is bounded by the Scioto River on the west, the Olentangy River on the east, State Route 161 on the north, and Highland Drive and Henderson Road on the south.

The region includes parts of Perry Township, Sharon Township, the City of Dublin, and the City of Worthington.

History
Northwest Columbus was originally defined as the area bounded by Kenny Road on the east, Dierker Road on the west, Bethel Road on the north, and Old Henderson Road on the south. It was later expanded to the boundaries of the Olentangy River on the east, the Scioto River on the west, State Route 161 on the north, and the border of Upper Arlington/Highland Drive on the south.

Northwest Columbus now includes  parts of Perry and Sharon Townships, Dublin, and Worthington. In 2007, the boundaries were changed to include only property within the City of Columbus.

Northwest Columbus used to be mainly farm land.  However, since the development of the automobile, they have evolved into suburbs. The area has now includes housing developments, commercial and entertainment sites, schools, and medical facilities.

Neighborhoods

Sharon Township
In 1796, the area now known as Sharon Township was part of the U.S. Military District. It was originally called Liberty Township and extended into Delaware County. On March 4, 1806, its name was changed to Sharon Township.  The Township was officially established with its current boundaries on March 4, 1816. Today, Sharon is bounded on the north by Delaware County, on the east by Blendon Township, on the south by Clinton Township and on the west by Perry Township.

Perry Township
Perry Township, formed in the early 1800s, was named after Commodore Oliver Hazard Perry. Perry is surrounded by Columbus, Upper Arlington, Dublin and Worthington.

Northcrest
Northcrest is bounded by Bethel Road on the north, Reed Road on the east, Woodrun Boulevard on the west, and West Henderson Road on the south. 

Northcrest is served by the  Columbus City School District, the Dublin City School District, and the Upper Arlington City School District.

Linworth

Linworth is located at the intersection of State Route 161 and Linworth Road  It is bordered on the west by Brookside Estates and the Ohio State University Airport, and on the east by State Route 315. The area derived its name from Dublin and Worthington.

Olentangy Commons

Olentangy Commons is  located in the Olentangy River Rd/W Henderson Rd area.  It provides off-campus housing to many Ohio State University (OSU) students.

Governor's Square

Governor's Square is located in the Kenny Rd/W Henderson Rd area. Almost half of the units  are occupied by single people/one person.

Transportation
The Central Ohio Transit Authority (COTA) has multiple lines in Northwest Columbus. Walking paths and bike lanes are newer additions to the region.  It is close to the Olentangy Trail.

Structures and landmarks
The Ohio State University Airport is located in Northwest Columbus  It contributes over $157 million in direct and indirect benefits to Central Ohio each year.

Entertainment

Entertainment in Northwest Columbus includes Cinemark Dollar Theater, Buckeye Entertainment, and Sawmill Lanes Bowling Alley.

Parks 
 Antrim Park
 Godown Road Dog Park 
 Riverside Green Park
 Carriage Place Recreation Center
 Northcrest Park 
 Anheuser Busch Sports Park
 Olentangy Park
 Shaker Square Park
 Sycamore Hills Park

Education
 Ridgeview Middle School  
 Centennial High School 
 Winterset Elementary School, 
 Gables Elementary School, 
 Wright Elementary School.

References

Geography of Ohio
Neighborhoods in Columbus, Ohio